Szatmary (or Szatmáry) is a Hungarian surname, derived from the former Szatmár County:

 Camil Szatmary (born 1909, date of death unknown), Romanian fencer.
 Kristóf Szatmáry (born 1975), Hungarian politician

See also

 Szathmary

Hungarian-language surnames